Al Ayyam (in Arabic الأيام; The Days) is a newspaper, based in Ramallah, Palestine.

History and profile
Al Ayyam was established in 1995, and it is the second-largest circulation daily newspaper in Palestine. Although it is an independent publication, it is considered to be a pro-government and pro-Fatah paper. 

Its editor-in-chief is Akram Haniyya.

References

External links
 

Newspapers published in the State of Palestine
Arabic-language newspapers
Newspapers established in 1995
Mass media in Ramallah
1995 establishments in the Palestinian territories